Route 318 is a collector road in the Canadian province of Nova Scotia.

It is located in the Halifax Regional Municipality and connects Dartmouth at Exit 6 of Highway 111 with Waverley at Trunk 2.

It is also called "Waverley Road" and "Braemar Drive."  The road follows the north shore of Lake Micmac, Lake Charles, Nova Scotia, and Lake William, which comprise part of the historic Shubenacadie Canal route.

History

Highway 318 was formerly designated as Trunk Highway 18.

Communities
Dartmouth
Port Wallace
Portobello
Waverley

See also
List of Nova Scotia provincial highways

References

Map of Nova Scotia

Roads in Halifax, Nova Scotia
Nova Scotia provincial highways